Josh Carpenter (born June 27, 1979), is a film, television, theater, internet and commercial actor whose credits include roles in the award-winning Azusa Pacific University student-produced short film Expiration Date, the television series Sex and The City, Curb your enthusiasm, Hostage: Do or Die, A skit on the show The Tonight Show with Jay Leno, and as the wolfman in the Paramore music video Brick by Boring Brick.

Born Joshua Adam Carpenter on June 27, 1979 in Tyler, Texas, Carpenter began acting and singing at an early age, earning roles in musicals and plays at Tyler's local Brickstreet Theatre and participating in acting workshops to further develop his talent.  After graduating from high school, he went on to college, but after a few years, decided to pursue acting as a career.

He moved to New York City where he performed in off Broadway children's shows, musicals, student films, indie films, in featured roles on television shows, and in black box theater. Studying with Matthew Corozine opened the passion and heart even more.

In 2008 he moved to Los Angeles, California, where he was soon booked for his first national commercial, a Budweiser spot televised during the Super Bowl, and has since been featured in a music video with the rock band Paramore, Toyota and Time Warner advertisements, Kirin High Ball international campaign, the television sitcoms Sex and the City and Curb Your Enthusiasm, and as a sketch actor on The Tonight Show with Jay Leno.

His student-produced short film Expiration Date won the Audience Choice Award for Best Student Film at the 2012 Oceanside International Film Festival, and was an Official Selection of the 2012 Riverside International Film Festival and Gangrene Short Comedy Film Festival.

Josh recently wrapped production on two short films filmed in Texas.  rotten. and Relentless will be hitting the festival circuit later this year 2015.

Carpenter returned to his hometown of Tyler, Texas to give back to the local and regional community through his participation in theater productions, East Texas Artists Nation, Actors’ Preparatory Exchange (APEX) programs. He has worked with Snap Brothers on a few of their commercials for Miller Lite and Hot Wheels. He now lives in New Orleans where he filmed a role on the Lifetime movie "Dreamhouse Nightmare" starring Rachel G. Whittle. He enjoys giving back to the community with his garden and keeping the earth green with the recycling program.  He is happily represented by Landrum Arts LA. When he is not acting he works for a boutique hotel in their sales department. He lives his life by the motto, "Find your Rainbow!"

Filmography 
 Dreamhouse Nightmare  (TV Movie, 2017)
 Relentless  (Short film, 2015)
 rotten.  (Short film, 2015)
 The Blind Artist (Short film, 2013)
 Serial Suburbia (Series, 2013)
 Expiration Date (Short film, 2012)
 Spin the Bottle: The Kiss of Death (2011)
 The Amazing Floydini (2004)
  Full Filmography at Internet Move Database.com

References

External links
  Josh Carpenter on Vimeo
 Expiration Date trailer
 

Living people
1979 births
People from Tyler, Texas
Male actors from Texas
American male film actors
American male television actors
American male voice actors
21st-century American male actors